Devante Darrius Rodney (born 19 May 1998) is an English professional footballer who plays as a forward for  club Rochdale.

He spent his youth at the academies at Manchester City and Sheffield Wednesday, before signing with Hartlepool United in January 2017. He made his senior debut four months later and established himself in the first-team in the 2017–18 season. He was sold on to Salford City in June 2018, though spent the second half of the 2018–19 season on loan at National League rivals FC Halifax Town, before returning to Salford to help the club to win promotion into the English Football League with victory in the 2019 play-off final. He spent much of the 2019–20 season out on loan at Stockport County and FC Halifax Town. He signed with Port Vale in July 2020 and finished as top-scorer for the 2020–21 campaign, before joining Walsall for an undisclosed fee in January 2022. He transferred to Rochdale in June 2022.

Career

Youth career
Rodney began his career in the youth team of Manchester City at the age of nine. He remained in Manchester for six years before joining the academy of Sheffield Wednesday.

Hartlepool United
On 6 January 2017, Rodney joined EFL League Two side Hartlepool United. He was reportedly not one of manager Craig Hignett's main targets and was assigned squad number 38 and sent to play for Sam Collins's reserve team. The club already had an established strike force in Pádraig Amond and Billy Paynter. New manager Dave Jones handed Rodney his professional debut on 1 April, in a 2–0 defeat to Portsmouth at Victoria Park. He scored two goals against Doncaster Rovers on the final day of the 2016–17 season as Hartlepool fought relegation, his goals were almost enough to keep the club up until Mark O'Brien scored a late winner for Newport County against Notts County to send Hartlepool down to the National League.

His next goal came on 14 October 2017, in a 2–1 win at South Shields in the FA Cup; manager Craig Harrison noted that "he’s had some great opportunities in the last four to five games. He could have had five goals to his name by now quite easily". Speaking the following March, new manager Matthew Bates said that Rodney was impressive in training and just needed to translate his hard work into goals. On 17 April, he was sent off for two bookable offences in a 1–0 home win over Leyton Orient. He ended the 2017–18 season with three goals in 22 starts and 22 substitute appearances as "Pools" posted a 15th-place finish and he turned down the club's offer of a new contract in the summer.

Salford City
On 15 June 2018, Rodney signed for newly-promoted National League team Salford City for an undisclosed fee, reported to be £20,000. In February 2019, he joined league rivals FC Halifax Town on loan for a month. He formed a successful strike partnership with fellow loanee Manny Duku and his loan deal was extended until the end of the 2018–19 season on 30 March. He scored seven goals in twelve games for Jamie Fullarton's "Shaymen". He returned to Moor Lane at the end of the loan period and came on as an extra-time substitute in the National League play-off semi-final victory over Eastleigh. He also featured in the play-off final at Wembley Stadium, coming on as a 55th-minute substitute for Gus Mafuta as the "Ammies" beat AFC Fylde 3–0 to secure promotion into the English Football League.

On 8 October 2019, Rodney was loaned back to the National League with Stockport County until January 2020; he had tried to rejoin Halifax but had to instead go to Edgeley Park as a deal could not be arranged. He returned to Salford in January 2020 on the expiry of his loan period, having scored three goals in 14 matches playing on the right-wing for Jim Gannon's "Hatters". The following day he went out on loan again, returning to FC Halifax Town; manager Pete Wild said that he was "absolutely ecstatic" to secure the player's services ahead of strong competition from other clubs. He enjoyed another successful loan spell at The Shay, scoring five goals in eight games. Rodney was released from his contract at Salford after manager Graham Alexander confirmed he would not be offered a new deal on 17 May. Halifax qualified for the play-offs, due to take place two months late in July 2020 due to the COVID-19 pandemic in England, but Wild confirmed that Rodney would not be featuring as he was in negotiations to sign for another club.

Port Vale
On 7 July 2020, Rodney signed a three-year contract with League Two side Port Vale; manager John Askey brought him to the club to compete with Tom Pope, Mark Cullen and fellow new signing Theo Robinson. He scored his first goal for the "Valiants" on 19 September, in a 2–0 win at Exeter City. Speaking in November, coach Dave Kevan said that Rodney had been "a little bit stop start" and that "he just needs to be consistent and believe in the abilities and the strengths and qualities he has as a player and recognise he can do damage at this level". Kevan said that Rodney gave his best performance yet in a 6–3 win at Bolton Wanderers on 5 December despite him not getting on the scoresheet as he "was a real outlet for us and he really occupied their back three". He began the 2020–21 season playing out wide, before spending time out with COVID-19 and then establishing himself as the club's central striker in December. He was nominated for the EFL League Two Player of the Month award after scoring four goals in four games in January, including a brace in a 5–1 win over Southend United. He was named as the club's Young Player of the Year after finishing as top-scorer with 12 goals from 44 games.

He was given a three match ban for an off-the-ball incident which had been missed by the match officials in a 2–1 win at Swindon Town on 11 September 2021. Speaking in the January transfer window, director of football David Flitcroft admitted that contract talks with the player had "flatlined" but that transfer bids from other clubs had been rejected as they had not met the club's valuation.

Walsall
On 28 January 2022, Rodney signed for fellow League Two side Walsall for an undisclosed fee (with add-on fees), signing a two-and-a-half year contract. Rodney said that he had spoken with head coach Matthew Taylor and technical director Jamie Fullarton – who he had worked with Halifax, and felt that the "Saddlers" playing style and ambitions were a good match for him. Taylor was sacked the following month, and new head coach Michael Flynn said that Rodney just needed to score his first goal at the Bescot Stadium in order to gain confidence. Teammate Conor Wilkinson said that Rodney was sharp in training and that his build up play was excellent, though he would end the 2021–22 season without a goal in his two starts and twelve substitute appearances.

Rochdale
On 15 June 2022, Rodney signed for Rochdale from Walsall on a two-year deal after the two clubs agreed a transfer; manager Robbie Stockdale said that "we want hungry players who we can also develop, and Devante falls into that category".

Style of play
Rodney is a forward with pace, energy and a high work-rate. Speaking in July 2020, Port Vale manager John Askey said that: "he is strong and quick and he has decent ability as well. There are things in his game he needs to improve, his hold up play and his heading. But his main asset is his pace and strength."

Career statistics

Honours
Salford City
National League play-offs: 2019

References

1998 births
Living people
Footballers from Manchester
Black British sportspeople
English footballers
Association football forwards
Manchester City F.C. players
Sheffield Wednesday F.C. players
Hartlepool United F.C. players
Salford City F.C. players
FC Halifax Town players
Stockport County F.C. players
Port Vale F.C. players
Walsall F.C. players
Rochdale A.F.C. players
English Football League players
National League (English football) players